Christina Meursinge Hall  (née Haack, formerly El Moussa and Anstead; born July 9, 1983) is an American real estate investor and TV personality. She previously co-starred on HGTV's show Flip or Flop alongside her now ex-husband Tarek El Moussa and the HGTV show,  Christina on the Coast. In 2023, she began starring in HGTV's Christina in the Country.

Early life 
Hall was born in Anaheim, California. She has a sister, Carly, who is ten years younger. She went to school in southern California and began working in the real estate industry after graduating from San Diego State University. In 2005, she first met future husband and business partner, Tarek El Moussa while the two were working as real estate agents at Prudential.

Career

Real estate
Hall ran the real-estate agency Tarek and Christina: The El Moussa Group with her first husband Tarek in Orange County, California. The husband-and-wife team sold real estate in the southern California area. When the housing market plummeted after the October 2008 stock market crash, their real estate business suffered. The El Moussas went from living in a $6,000-per-month house to a $700-per-month apartment in just a few years.

In 2010, the El Moussas, along with their business partner Pete De Best, bought their first investment property in Santa Ana, California for $115,000, selling the property for a profit of $34,000. The trio continued to flip houses, expanding their real-estate investing business into Arizona and Nevada.

The El Moussa Group was dissolved in 2018. The business is now owned by Tarek and Associates, a sole venture of Tarek El Moussa.

Television
In 2011, Tarek El Moussa asked a friend to help him make an audition tape for HGTV. Pie Town Productions expressed interest in the tape. HGTV producers had also noticed the couple's Instagram profile, which featured before and after profiles of several renovation projects.

In 2012, HGTV signed the couple to produce a show for the network. In April 2013, Flip Or Flop debuted on the network. In a 2014 interview, Hall said, "Each episode shows things that can go wrong, and do go wrong".

In June 2018, it was announced that Hall would be featured in her own spin-off show, Christina on the Coast. The first episode of season 1 focused on Hall renovating her new post-divorce home, with the remaining seven episodes focusing on her renovating other people's homes. Filming began in fall 2018, for a spring 2019 premiere. The show's second season premiered on January 2, 2020, on HGTV.

In 2017, Hall presented at the Daytime Emmys.

Other ventures 
In March 2020, Hall released a book, The Wellness Remodel, with certified nutritionist Cara Clark.

On July 14, 2020, Hall announced she will be partnering with Spectra Furniture to create a furniture line for the brand. The new line, Christina HOME, debuted in October 2020. In November 2021, Hall created a luxury vinyl flooring line, The Christina Collection, that features 21 different colors and styles.

Public image 
During her career, Hall has been featured in numerous publications including Good Housekeeping and the Orange County Register. She has also appeared on the cover of HGTV magazine and People.

Personal life

Marriage to Tarek El Moussa 
In October 2006, she began dating Tarek El Moussa, and the couple married in 2009. Their daughter was born in 2010 and their son was born in 2015.

In 2013, Tarek was diagnosed with both thyroid and testicular cancer. When doctors recommended radiation treatment, the couple decided to bank Tarek's sperm and try in-vitro fertilization to have a second child. The first attempt failed and Christina suffered a miscarriage on the second try. She became pregnant with their son in 2015.

In May 2016, the couple separated after an incident at their Southern California home. Tarek was found by the police on a nearby hiking trail and was in possession of a handgun. He maintained he was never suicidal and had simply gone for a hike, taking a gun to protect himself from wild animals.

Tarek and Christina filed for divorce in 2017 and the divorce was finalized in January 2018.

Marriage to Ant Anstead
In November 2017, she began dating English television presenter Ant Anstead. On December 22, 2018, she married Anstead at their Newport Beach, California home and officially changed her name to Christina Anstead, dropping the last name of her first husband. The couple's only child together was born on September 6, 2019. They announced their separation on September 18, 2020, and she filed for divorce in November. She also reverted to her maiden name of Christina Haack. The divorce was finalized in June 2021. On April 28, 2022, Anstead filed for full custody of Hudson, accusing Haack of exploiting their son on social media.

Marriage to Joshua Hall 
In July 2021, People magazine announced that Haack was dating realtor Joshua Hall, and the couple got engaged the following September. On April 5, 2022, it was reported the couple married with her name also changing to Christina Hall. On September 3, 2022, the couple married a second time in Hawaii.

Illness 
In December 2022, Hall said that she had undergone quantum biofeedback machine testing at an alternative medicine center, and the results showed she had been diagnosed with "mercury and lead poisoning", which she believed was caused by remodeling and flipping "gross" houses. She also believes her illnesses might be attributed to breast implants. In addition, she says that she has been diagnosed with "small intestine bacterial overgrowth" which she intends to treat with "herbs" and intravenous treatments.

Filmography

References

External links
 "HGTV's Flip or Flop". HGTV.
 "Local couple star in HGTV reality show on flipping houses". The Orange County Register. California.
 

American real estate brokers
American television hosts
American women television presenters
Flip or Flop (franchise)
Living people
People from Anaheim, California
1983 births